Eulima montagueana is a species of sea snail, a marine gastropod mollusk in the family Eulimidae. The species is one of a number within the genus Eulima.

Distribution
This marine species is endemic to Australia and occurs off Western Australia.

References

 Iredale, T. 1914. Report on Mollusca collected at the Monte Bello Islands. Proceedings of the Zoological Society of London 1914: 665-675

External links
 To World Register of Marine Species

montagueana
Gastropods described in 1914
Gastropods of Australia